De Vlieger may refer to:

Geert De Vlieger (born 1971), former footballer
Henk de Vlieger (born 1953), musician
Simon de Vlieger (1601–1653), artist
Thijs de Vlieger (born 1982), musician